Ernest Raymond Steele (November 2, 1917 – October 16, 2006) was an American football running back in the National Football League for the Philadelphia Eagles, and the "Steagles", a team that resulted in the temporary merger of the Eagles and Pittsburgh Steelers in 1943.  A graduate of Highline High School in Burien, Washington (which made him a charter member of its Athletic Hall of Fame in 1999), he played college football at the University of Washington and was drafted in the tenth round of the 1942 NFL Draft by the Pittsburgh Steelers.

He played in two NFL championship games for the Philadelphia Eagles.

After ending his football career, Steele opened a diner and sports bar in Seattle, named "Ernie Steele's." It became a landmark and operated under that name until he sold it in 1993.  After the sale it was known for eight years as Ileen's Sports Bar, but the back was called "The Ernie Room." Since 2001, it has been a drag bar called Julia's.

Steele died in Seattle, Washington, on October 16, 2006.

References

External links

1917 births
2006 deaths
People from Bothell, Washington
American football running backs
Highline High School alumni
Washington Huskies football players
Philadelphia Eagles players
Steagles players and personnel